Still photography may refer to:
 Photography
 Still life photography, photographs containing mostly inanimate subject matter, often in small groupings
 Unit still photographer, a person who creates still photographic images for the publicity of films and television programs
 Still frame, a film frame taken from a motion picture